The 2014 World Indoor Target Archery Championships was the 12th edition of the World Indoor Archery Championships. The event was held in Nîmes, France, from February 26 to March 2, 2014, and was organized by World Archery.

Events

Recurve

Senior

Junior

Compound

Senior

Junior

Medal table

Participating nations
45 nations registered 353 athletes across disciplines, significantly more than in Las Vegas in 2012.

  (1)
  (1)
  (3)
  (4)
  (11)
  (13)
  (2)
  (7)
  (8)
  (3)
  (6)
  (1)
  (3)
  (8) 
  (22)
  (5)
  (12)
  (8)
  (12)
  (1)
  (3)
  (5)
  (2)
  (21)
  (1)
  (8)
  (2)
  (1)
  (3)
  (14) 
  (4)
  (8)
  (5)
  (13)
  (24)
  (12)
  (5)
  (9)
  (1)
  (11)
  (8)
  (12)
  (24)
  (24)
  (3)

References

World Championship
World Archery
2014
International archery competitions hosted by France